Poundmaker 114 is an Indian reserve of the Poundmaker Cree Nation in Saskatchewan. It is 40 kilometres west of North Battleford. In the 2016 Canadian Census, it recorded a population of 547 living in 176 of its 201 total private dwellings. In the same year, its Community Well-Being index was calculated at 53 of 100, compared to 58.4 for the average First Nations community and 77.5 for the average non-Indigenous community.

References

Indian reserves in Saskatchewan
Division No. 13, Saskatchewan